Mary E. Lidstrom is a Professor of Microbiology at the University of Washington. She also holds the Frank Jungers Chair of Engineering, in the Department of Chemical Engineering. She currently is a fellow of the American Academy of Microbiology, a member of the National Academy of Sciences and serves on the editorial boards of the Journal of Bacteriology and FEMS Microbial Ecology.

Education
Lidstrom received a B.S. degree in Microbiology from Oregon State University and an M.S. and Ph.D. in Bacteriology from the University of Wisconsin-Madison.

Research career
Lidstrom's work spans microbial physiology and natural complex microbial communities and has applications to biotechnology.  Specifically she has worked extensively on methylotroph bacteria that grow on one-carbon compounds.

After conducting her doctorate research on C-1 metabolism in Methylobacterium organophilum, Lidstrom undertook post-doctoral research at University of Sheffield UK with J. Rodney Quayle on species of the methylotrophic yeasts Hansenula and Candida, and then returned to the US with faculty posts at the University of Washington, University of Wisconsin-Milwaukee and the California Institute of Technology where she has taught courses on microbiology, oceanography, environmental engineering science, chemical engineering and bioengineering. While at CalTech she served as Vice-Chair of the Faculty. In 1996 she moved to University of Washington and has remained there.

Lidstrom is a fellow of the American Academy of Microbiology and a member of the National Academy of Sciences from 2013. Lidstrom was the Vice Provost of Research at the University of Washington from 2005 until 2021. In addition, she served as Associate Dean for New Initiatives in Engineering from 1997-2005 and Interim Provost from 2010-2011.

Publications
Lidstrom is the author or co-author of over 300 scientific publications. These include:

 Yanning Zheng, Derek F. Harris, Yu Zheng and 9 further authors including Mary E. Lidstrom (2018) A pathway for biological methane production using bacterial iron-only nitrogenase. Nature Microbiology 3 (3) 281-286
 Frances Chu and Mary E. Lidstrom (2016) XoxF acts as the predominant methanol dehydrogenase in the type I methanotroph Methylomicrobium buryatense. American Society for Microbiology 8 (198) 1317-1325
 Mary E. Lidstrom and Michael C. Konopka (2010) The role of physiological heterogeneity in microbial population behavior. Nature Chemical Biology 6 (10) 705-712
 Ludmila Chistoserdova, Marina G. Kalyuzhnaya and Mary E. Lidstrom (2009) The Expanding World of Methylotrophic Metabolism. Annual Review of Microbiology 63 477-499

Honors 

 American Society for Microbiology Proctor & Gamble Award for Applied and Environmental Microbiology, 2013
 Member of National Academy of Sciences, 2013
 Howard Hughes Medical Center for Learning at the Life Science/Engineering Boundary Award, 2010
 ASM Graduate Microbiology Teaching and Mentoring Award, 2006
 American Association for the Advancement of Science Fellow, 2005
 American Academy of Microbiology, 1992
 NSF Faculty Award for Women, 1991

References

Living people
Place of birth missing (living people)
University of Washington faculty
American microbiologists
Women microbiologists
Oregon State University alumni
University of Wisconsin–Madison alumni
Members of the United States National Academy of Sciences
1951 births